Porrocaecum is a genus of nematodes belonging to the family Toxocaridae.

The genus has cosmopolitan distribution.

Species

Species:

Porrocaecum angusticolle 
Porrocaecum ardeae

References

Nematodes